is a Japanese football player. He plays for J1 League side Avispa Fukuoka, on loan from the same-league club Hokkaido Consadole Sapporo.

Career
Takahiro Yanagi joined FC Tokyo in 2016. On March 13, he debuted in J3 League (v SC Sagamihara).

Club statistics
Updated to end of 2018 season.

References

External links
Profile at FC Tokyo

1997 births
Living people
Association football people from Tokyo
Japanese footballers
Association football defenders
J1 League players
J3 League players
FC Tokyo players
FC Tokyo U-23 players
Montedio Yamagata players
Vegalta Sendai players
Hokkaido Consadole Sapporo players
Avispa Fukuoka players